Chaifetz Arena, located on the campus of Saint Louis University, is a 10,600 seat multi-purpose arena in St. Louis, Missouri, that began construction on August 28, 2006 and opened on April 10, 2008.

In February 2007, Chicago-based businessman Richard Chaifetz, CEO of ComPsych Corporation and 1975 graduate of SLU, made a $12 million donation to the university, which named the arena in his honor.

Since the 2008–09 season, it has been the home of the Saint Louis University men's and women's basketball teams. Additionally, the attached Chaifetz Pavilion includes a two-court basketball and volleyball practice facility that also serves as an 800-seat venue that is the home for the university's volleyball teams. The arena, known as "the Jewel of Midtown," includes a three-story athletic office.  Chaifetz Arena has been called by former VCU coach Shaka Smart as the toughest venue to play in the Atlantic 10 Conference.

Men's basketball record at Chaifetz Arena

Events
The first event held at the venue was a Harlem Globetrotters game against the Washington Generals, played on April 11, 2008.

Barry Manilow performed the inaugural concert at Chaifetz Arena on April 25, 2008.

The first student concert was held on April 26, 2008 featuring artists Tyler Hilton, Chingy, The Starting Line, Jo Dee Messina, and Augustana.

Saint Louis University held its first commencement ceremony on campus in 60 years at the arena on May 17, 2008.  Fox Sports personality and native St. Louisan Joe Buck delivered the Commencement Address.

The first political rally at the Arena was on October 2, 2008, for Republican vice presidential candidate Sarah Palin. She appeared to supporters after the 2008 Vice Presidential debate held at Washington University in St. Louis.

FIRST Robotics Competition has held its St. Louis FRC Regional at Chaifetz Arena for several years.

American Idols Live! made its Chaifetz Arena debut in 2009, having previously been held at the Enterprise Center (2002) and Family Arena (2003-2008).  Chaifetz Arena also became the St. Louis stop for Champions on Ice and Cirque du Soleil, also in 2009.

The arena hosted the Monster Truck Spectacular Fall Nationals on October 17, 2009.

The USA Gymnastics Championships occurred June 7–10, 2012 at the Chaifetz Arena.

TNA No Surrender took place at the arena on September 12, 2013

March 6, 2016 Bruce Springsteen performed to the largest sold-out crowd in the building's history with 10,247 sold tickets.

The 2016 Men's U.S. Olympic Trials and P&G Gymnastics Championships were held at Chaifetz Arena June 23–26, 2016. The 2018 SEC Gymnastics championships were held at the arena.

WWE held its first show there on July 21, 2018.

League of Legends North American LCS spring finals was held on April 13, 2019 at the Chaifetz Arena.

Professional wrestling promotion All Elite Wrestling held an episode of their weekly television show AEW Rampage at the arena on November 5, 2021.

References

External links
Official website
Archived Construction Camera

2008 establishments in Missouri
Basketball venues in St. Louis
College basketball venues in the United States
College gymnastics venues in the United States
Gymnastics venues in the United States
Saint Louis Billikens basketball venues
Sports venues completed in 2008
Sports venues in Missouri
Sports venues in St. Louis
Indoor arenas in Missouri